is a commuter railway station on the Enoshima Electric Railway (Enoden) located in the city of Fujisawa, Kanagawa Prefecture, Japan.

Lines

Station layout
The station consists of a single island platform serving two tracks, connected to the station building by an underpass.

Platforms

History 
Kugenuma Station was opened on 1 September 1902. The station building was rebuilt in 1985.

Station numbering was introduced to the Enoshima Electric Railway January 2014 with Kugenuma being assigned station numbers EN04.

Passenger statistics
In fiscal 2019, the station was used by an average of 4,278 passengers daily, making it the 4th used of the 15 Enoden stations 

The passenger figures for previous years are as shown below.

Surrounding area
Sakai River
 Shonan Gakuen Junior and Senior High School

See also
 List of railway stations in Japan

References

External links

Enoden station information 

Railway stations in Kanagawa Prefecture
Railway stations in Japan opened in 1902
Railway stations in Fujisawa, Kanagawa